Jonas Čepulis (11 August 1939 – 28 May 2015) was a Lithuanian amateur heavyweight boxer who won a silver medal at the 1968 Olympics. He won his first three bouts by technical knockout (TKO), and lost in the finals by TKO to George Foreman.

Čepulis never won a Soviet title, placing second-third in 1965–66 and 1968 and therefore was not selected for the world and European championships. He won Lithuanian titles in 1963–1964, 1966–1967 and 1969–1970 and retired in 1970 with a record of 203 wins out of 230 bouts. He later worked at a Pergalės factory in Kaunas.

In episode 3 of season two of Better Late Than Never the family of Čepulis has a reunion with George Foreman.

References

1939 births
2015 deaths
People from Pasvalys District Municipality
Lithuanian male boxers
Heavyweight boxers
Boxers at the 1968 Summer Olympics
Olympic boxers of the Soviet Union
Olympic silver medalists for the Soviet Union
Olympic medalists in boxing
Soviet male boxers
Medalists at the 1968 Summer Olympics